Jean Gallice (born 13 May 1949 in Bordeaux) is a French former professional football (soccer) player.

External links
 
 

1949 births
Living people
Footballers from Bordeaux
French footballers
France international footballers
Ligue 1 players
Angoulême Charente FC players
FC Girondins de Bordeaux players
Olympique Lyonnais players
Racing Besançon players
FC Libourne players
Association football midfielders